= Unfurl the flag =

Australian patriotic song

"Unfurl the flag" is an Australian patriotic song in support of the federation of the Australian colonies into a single nation in the late 19th century. Created during the 1890s, the song's lyrics were written by Francis Hart, with music composed by Sir William Robinson.

== Lyrics ==
Australia's sons your flag unfold

And proudly wave the banner high

That ev'ry nation may behold

Our glorious standard in the sky

Unfurl the flag that all may see

Our proudest boast is liberty

Unfurl the flag that all may see

Our proudest boast is liberty

Rejoice in treasures 'neath the earth

In precious gold, in store profuse

Grant us to know its noblest worth

Its object and its fitting use

Unfurl the flag that all may see

Our proudest boast is liberty

Unfurl the flag that all may see

Our proudest boast is liberty

To England, Queen and Austral clime

Unite in true and loyal toast

And let it be our song sublime

That freedom is our country's boast

Unfurl the flag that all may see

Our proudest boast is liberty

Unfurl the flag that all may see

Our proudest boast is liberty (x2)
